The Florida International University College of Engineering and Computing, located in Miami, Florida in the United States is one of the university's 26 schools and colleges and was originally established in 1973 as the School of Technology. The College of Engineering and Computing offers bachelor's, master's and doctorate degrees within the college's 8 separate schools, departments and institutes. The college offers online and distance learning courses and programs through the Office of Distance Education. This office was previously known as FIU FEEDS, a statewide distance learning initiative adopted by the college in 1985.

The College of Engineering and Computing currently offers bachelor's, master's and doctorate degrees in Biomedical Engineering, Civil Engineering, Computer Engineering, Computer Science, Construction Management, Electrical Engineering, Environmental Engineering, Information Technology, Networking & Telecommunications, and Mechanical Engineering.

There are currently over 2,800 undergraduate and 700 graduate students in the college split into various academic departments and schools:

Knight Foundation School of Computing and Information Sciences
Moss School of Construction, Infrastructure and Sustainability
Moss Department of Construction Management
Department of Civil and Environmental Engineering
School of Universal Computing, Construction and Engineering Education
School of Electrical, Computer and Enterprise Engineering
Department of Electrical and Computer Engineering
Department of Enterprise and Logistics Engineering
School of Biomedical, Materials and Mechanical Engineering
Department of Biomedical Engineering
Department of Mechanical and Materials Engineering

The College of Engineering and Computing houses 25 facilities, including research centers, institutes and laboratories. Research is conducted both independently and in cooperation with industry leaders and academic institutions, with nearly $50 million in external funding over the last five years from a variety of government and corporate sources

Accomplishments and rankings
The team from the ABC/FIU Student Chapter in Construction Management won the Grand Champions Award at the 6th Annual Associated Builders and Contractors (ABC) Construction Management Competition, held in March in Las Vegas. FIU also won first place in estimating (in a tie with University of Washington) and second place in project management/scheduling.
The College's Solar Decathlon student team Won #1 in the Energy Balance Competition, was Voted Most Popular in DIY Network, and finished #13 overall in an unparalleled solar competition to design, build, and operate the most attractive and energy-efficient solar-powered home. FIU was the only university from Florida and the entire Southeast to compete.
IEEE Student Branch won the first place of the Annual Software Competition beating major schools in the Southeast USA at the 2005 IEEE Regions Southeast Conference.
ACM Student Chapter is a proud recipient of the National Outstanding Student Chapter Activities Award for two years in a row, 2017–18 and 2018–19.
The Biomedical Engineering Society student chapter has won the "Fleetest Fleet" award two years running (2004 and 2005) in the Annual Biomedical Engineering Society Meeting.
BME has the highest percentage of Honors students at the undergraduate level and highest percentage of Presidential Fellows at the graduate level for the entire University.
Eta Kappa Nu Kappa Delta Chapter is a proud recipient of the National Outstanding Chapter Award (OCA) for 2004–05. The OCA is a mark of significant distinction for a college chapter.
Materials Advantage was awarded the "Chapter of Excellence" for two years in a row, 2004 and 2005.
The College of Engineering and Computing is ranked #1 in awarding Engineering Bachelor's and master's degrees to Hispanics in the continental US and #1 in enrolling Hispanic graduate students in science and engineering in the continental US.
The College has the 2nd largest number of degree programs in engineering in the State of Florida.

Facilities
In 1973, the School of Technology was established with former Dean, Robert Ellis at the original University Park Campus. The College of Technology later established a School of Engineering as a division in 1983, under Dean Lambert Tall and Associate Dean Leroy Thompson. The college became official in 1984 as the College of Engineering and Applied Sciences and was later renamed to the College of Engineering and Design in 1989. In 1998, the college relocated to the Cordis building and was renamed to the College of Engineering. In 2005, School of Computing and Information Sciences joined and the College of Engineering and Computing was born. The two facilities house world class research centers, teaching laboratories, faculty offices, study areas, computing facilities, and research laboratories. The college also offers classes for students who live farther north of the city at the Biscayne Bay Campus in North Miami, as well as at the FIU at I-75 in Broward County.

References

External links
 
 Florida International University
 FIU Office of Distance Education

Florida International University